Santa Croce Camerina is a town and  in the province of Ragusa, Sicily, in southern Italy. As of 2017 its population was of 10,973.

Geography
The municipal territory of Santa Croce is surrounded by the one of Ragusa, except for the coastline.

See also
Marina di Ragusa
Scoglitti
Donnalucata
Donnafugata Castle

References

External links

 Official website

Municipalities of the Province of Ragusa